Agachaul (Agaç-aul) is a rural locality (a selo) in Karabudakhkentsky District, Republic of Dagestan, Russia. The population was 1,811 as of 2010. There are 22 streets.

Nationalities 
Kumyks live there.

Geography
Agachaul is located 39 km northwest of Karabudakhkent (the district's administrative centre) by road. Novy Kyakhulay and Talgi are the nearest rural localities.

References 

Rural localities in Karabudakhkentsky District